Slaley Hall is a country house golf resort in Northumberland in North East England, built by local developers Seamus O'Carroll and John Rourke which hosted The Great North Open between 1996 and 2002. It is surrounded by 1000 acres (4 km²) of Northumberland forest and moorland. It also hosts Weddings, Anniversaries, Parties and Business events in the hotel run by the QHotels Group.

It has many facilities including an indoor swimming pool, beauty salon, steam room, sauna, gym, sun beds, jacuzzi, and driving range.

The England Football team have stayed at Slaley Hall when they are playing in the North East of England.

The hall has been used for concerts by Elton John, Madonna, Michael Jackson, Janet Jackson, Paul McCartney, Paul Weller and The Cure.

The grounds include the Japanese Garden, a rare surviving example of a rock garden. It was designed and laid out before the First World War by the world-renowned Backhouse Nurseries of Acomb, near York.

External links
Slaley Hall Hotel (official site)
 Slaley Hall Golf Club (official site)

Hotels in Northumberland
Sports venues in Northumberland
Golf clubs and courses in Northumberland